In enzymology, an asparagine-oxo-acid transaminase is an enzyme that catalyzes the chemical reaction

L-asparagine + a 2-oxo acid  2-oxosuccinamate + an amino acid

Thus, the two substrates of this enzyme are L-asparagine and 2-oxo acid, whereas its two products are 2-oxosuccinamate and amino acid.

This enzyme belongs to the family of transferases, specifically the transaminases, which transfer nitrogenous groups.  The systematic name of this enzyme class is L-asparagine:2-oxo-acid aminotransferase. This enzyme is also called asparagine-keto acid aminotransferase.  This enzyme participates in alanine and aspartate metabolism and tetracycline biosynthesis.  It employs one cofactor, pyridoxal phosphate.

References

 

EC 2.6.1
Pyridoxal phosphate enzymes
Enzymes of unknown structure